The open-mid front unrounded vowel, or low-mid front unrounded vowel, is a type of vowel sound used in some spoken languages. The symbol in the International Phonetic Alphabet that represents this sound is a Latinised variant of the Greek lowercase epsilon, .

Features

Occurrence

See also
 Index of phonetics articles

Notes

References

External links
 

Open-mid vowels
Front vowels
Unrounded vowels